M'Bengué Department is a department of Poro Region in Savanes District, Ivory Coast. In 2021, its population was 114,971 and its seat is the settlement of M'Bengué. The sub-prefectures of the department are Bougou, Katiali, Katogo, and M'Bengué.

History
M'Bengué Department was created in 2012 by dividing Korhogo Department.

Notes

Departments of Poro Region
States and territories established in 2012
2012 establishments in Ivory Coast